The Nuna people, or Nunuma, are subgroup of the Gurunsi people in Southern Burkina Faso, estimated 150,000 population, and Ghana. The Nuna are known for their masks. The group speaks the Nuni language.

Culture 
Nuna art is distinguished in particular by its very colorful masks - red, white and black - statuettes in clay and wood,  stools and  jewels, generally destined to honor the ancestors.

References

Ethnic groups in Burkina Faso
Ethnic groups in Ghana